Anna Kennedy (born 12 March 1960) is an educator who has worked to provide an improved education and other facilities for children with autistic spectrum disorders. In pursuing support for these children, she has established two schools, a college, a respite home and a website with over 50,000 international followers.

Kennedy was appointed an OBE (Royal Reward for Inspirational Mother) Award by Queen Elizabeth II at Buckingham Palace in 2012 for her services. Kennedy is the special education correspondent of the psychology website Psychreg.

Early life
Born in Middlesbrough to Maria and Antonino Sammarone, she studied at Sacred Heart School Middlesbrough. Before leaving for Italy, she had set up a dance school, which was owned and run by her for a number of years. She married Sean Kennedy, a qualified legal solicitor, in 1998. They had two sons, Patrick and Angelo; when the boys reached school age, Kennedy then discovered that they were affected with autistic spectrum disorders.

It was difficult for Anna and Sean to find a suitable education for their eight-year-old, affected by Asperger Syndrome and five-year-old with autism; they started a support group in their home, which grew rapidly and was joined by 275 families. They remortgaged their house in order to raise funds to open a school with special educational needs for their children.

Hillingdon Manor School
Anna and her husband prepared a feasibility report to convert a local school, which was apparently due to be demolished, into a school for special needs children. Volunteers were also coming out to help them, including carpenters, electricians and painters. Anna also approached the probation service for volunteers to come and help. Hillingdon Manor School for autistic children opened in 1999, with only 19 pupils. Initially, this school had places for 14 children, later increased to 63 places by 2002. The funding for places by the local authority was based upon the condition that parents of autistic children select this school as a suitable place for their special children's needs. This school is now building a brighter future with safe and structured education for 150 special children. The school was subject to an emergency Ofsted report in January 2017, the report for which was published in March. The inspection found that the school did not meet all of the independent school standards that were examined during the inspection. Deficiencies found included out-of-date "safeguarding policy documents", an insufficiently robust approach to "safer recruitment", including "prohibition orders" and vetting, lacked a "written risk assessment policy", and its "health and safety policy" was sparse, and in need of updating, referring to the "new government" of 2010, among other faults. The report also stated, "The school is a safe and secure learning environment and pupils behave well. There are high ratios of staff to pupils and leaders have ensured that staff members are deployed effectively."

Online presence
She has more than 50,000 online followers through her website including the parents of autistic children, professionals, media and those who are concerned with Autism. She is constantly creating awareness about Autism and making efforts to raise funds in order to continue their work.

Training
Anna also provides training for the National Society for the Prevention of Cruelty to Children (NSPCC) and Child line with regards to the disability bullying issue and create awareness about autism all over the UK.

Not Stupid
In 2009, Anna wrote a book named, Not Stupid which was about the struggle she had to set up the school for her kids.
Based on the story of a mother who fights to rescue the lives of her children from autism this bestselling biography is available on Amazon.

DVD
A fitness DVD, 'Step in The Right Direction' was a groundbreaking project which features a dance DVD, offering a clear picture of Autism Spectrum Condition (ASC). It has been launched in Birmingham at the British Institute of Learning Disabilities Conference.

Daisy Chain
Anna accepted a role as Patron in a bid to boost the profile of a charity called the Daisy Chain Charity which helps support families with autistic children. She has visited Calf Fallow farm, the home of Daisy Chain, to meet staff and see for herself the work being done there.

"This is really very good, I am very impressed," she said afterwards. ''The space available here is fantastic and just what is needed as we move forward and develop the services Daisy Chain provides. I am really excited about coming on board at this stage of development."

Autism Got Talent
It was the first talent show organised by Anna on 12 May 2012. In this show, autistic children and adults performed on the stage at London's Mermaid Theatre.
A performance from James Hobley, an autistic dancer, was also included in this show who had appeared on Britain's Got Talent.

Other activities
During Autism Awareness Month, April 2013, ABA and Anna launched their 'Give Us a Break' campaign.
This campaign aimed to raise awareness about the bullying of autistic children in school and colleges, particularly during break times, highlighted the need for autistic children to feel safe by providing them opportunities to indulge in positive activities and to encourage schools and colleges to share the ways they can improve their social skills and keep them safe too.

She highlighted the activities that can keep children from bullying during lunch times.  She also emphasised that there should be a strong communication between the parents and school which comes up with a 24-hour curriculum for the children in order to get a better idea about their behaviour all day and to prevent them getting mixed messages by parents and teachers.

In 2001, Anna also set up a community college for adults.  The former Prime Minister's wife, Samantha Cameron, was invited to the official opening of a specialist school set up by Anna Kennedy in Kent, South East London.

Awards
Kennedy was awarded an OBE in the Queen's Birthday Honors by Queen Elizabeth II at Buckingham Palace, for her services and campaigning work for autistic children.
She won an award named, 'Woman of the Year' in 2009 which runs with the collaboration of The Observer and Smooth Radio.  Kennedy received the Institute of Directors Chairman's special award for her contributions to the community.
She is the "Achieving Mum of the Year" of Tesco Mum of the Year Awards 2013 for her campaigning work for autistic children.
She is an ambassador for the Outcomes First Group.

Media
Anna's story has been published in various magazines and newspapers, and appeared as 'pick of the day' an hour long Video Diary Documentary on BBC. Anna's story and the work she has been involved with was also discussed in depth in an episode of The Autism Podcast.

References

1960 births
Autism activists
Living people
Special education in the United Kingdom
National Society for the Prevention of Cruelty to Children people
British women activists
People from Middlesbrough